Brandon Forsyth (born November 8, 1979) is an American former competitive ice dancer. With Emilie Nussear, he is the 2000 World Junior silver medalist. They were coached by Bob Young in Simsbury, Connecticut. In the summer of 2000, Forsyth teamed up with Jessica Joseph. They became the 2001 U.S. national bronze medalists and alternates to the 2002 Winter Olympics. They were coached by Alexander Zhulin and Samvel Gezalian in Hackensack, New Jersey. Forsyth formed a partnership with Lydia Manon in March 2005.

Programs 
(with Joseph)

Competitive highlights 
GP: Grand Prix; JGP: Junior Grand Prix

With O'Donnell

With Nussear

With Joseph

References

External links
 

1979 births
American male ice dancers
Living people
World Junior Figure Skating Championships medalists